Ernest Edgar "Ern" Henfry (24 July 1921 – 14 January 2007) was an Australian rules footballer who played for  in the Western Australian National Football League (WANFL) and  in the Victorian Football League (VFL). He later served as coach of Perth, and also coached Western Australia, having previously played at state level for both WA and Victoria. He was inducted into the Australian Football Hall of Fame in 2014.

Career
Henfry made his senior debut for Perth during the 1937 season, aged 16 years and 49 days, with only seven other players known to have debuted at a younger age. He played twice at state level during the 1939 season, at the age of 17, and then finished second to Haydn Bunton in the 1941 Sandover Medal. During the Second World War, Henfry served in the Australian Defence Force (ADF), initially as a private in the Australian Army, and then as a flight lieutenant in the Royal Australian Air Force (RAAF). While training in Sydney, he played for a RAAF team in the New South Wales Australian National Football League (NSWANFL), which included several VFL and SANFL players, including  captain Alby Morrison. In 1944, while based in Victoria, he played two games for Carlton. When the war ended, he remained in Victoria, and Carlton requested a clearance from Perth to enable him to play for them. He was forced to sit out the 1946 season as Perth did not agree to a clearance, but was then able to captain Carlton for the 1947 season. It was a successful year, with Carlton defeating Essendon in a one-point thriller in the Grand Final. The season was capped off when he shared Carlton's best and fairest award with his close friend Bert Deacon, who also won the Brownlow Medal that year, Carlton's first. Henfry placed fourth in the Brownlow count. In 1949, after some controversy, he captained Victoria against Western Australia, being only the second man to represent Victoria after first representing Western Australia.

Returning to Western Australia before the 1953 season, Henfry captain-coached Perth for two seasons before retiring from playing. Henfry remained Perth's coach until the 1959 season, and then again from the 1962 season through to the 1964 season, overall coaching the club in 242 games with a win rate of 57.4%. He also coached the state team in six matches during the 1956 and 1957 seasons, including at the 1956 Australian National Football Carnival, held in Perth, with WA placing second. During the 1961 season, during the gap between his years coaching Perth, Henfry coached the University of Western Australia's side in the Western Australian Amateur Football League (WAAFL) to an A-grade premiership. Henfry died in Inglewood, a suburb of Perth, in January 2007, aged 85. He had been an inaugural inductee into the West Australian Football Hall of Fame in 2004, and was posthumously inducted into the Australian Football Hall of Fame in 2014.

References

External links

 Ern Henfry WANFL playing statistics

1921 births
2007 deaths
Australian Army soldiers
Australian Football Hall of Fame inductees
Australian rules footballers from Perth, Western Australia
Burials at Karrakatta Cemetery
Carlton Football Club players
Carlton Football Club Premiership players
John Nicholls Medal winners
People educated at Perth Modern School
Perth Football Club coaches
Perth Football Club players
Royal Australian Air Force personnel of World War II
West Australian Football Hall of Fame inductees
Australian Army personnel of World War II
Royal Australian Air Force officers
One-time VFL/AFL Premiership players
Military personnel from Western Australia